Ramon Sentel Foster (born January 7, 1986), nicknamed "The Big Ragu", is a former American football guard who played 11 seasons for the Pittsburgh Steelers of the National Football League (NFL). He is the brother of former Rams offensive lineman Renardo Foster. He played college football at Tennessee where he played in a career total of 44 games and also earned All-SEC honors as a freshman and a junior. Foster is a member of Kappa Alpha Psi fraternity.

Early career
Foster started for all four years, both on offense and defense, at Ripley High School in Ripley, Tennessee and handled some placekicking and kickoff duties. In addition, he was a three-year starter on the school's basketball team and competed in track and field, achieving a career-best shot put of 45-11.

Professional career
Coming out of Tennessee in 2009, Foster attended the NFL combine and participated at Tennessee's annual Pro Day. He was projected by many analysts to be drafted from anywhere from the sixth to seventh round or a priority undrafted free agent. He was rated as the 23rd best offensive tackle in the draft out of the 183 available by NFLDraftScout.com.

2009
On April 27, 2009, Foster was signed as an undrafted free agent by the Pittsburgh Steelers.

He entered training camp competing to be a back-up guard against the Steelers' 2009 third-round draft pick, Kraig Urbik. Following an injury to starting veteran guard Darnell Stapleton during training camp, Foster gained the opportunity to become the starting right guard. He ultimately lost the starting job to Trai Essex and was named at backup guard and right tackle to begin the season. He made his professional regular season debut during a Week 3 contest at the Cincinnati Bengals. On  November 29, 2009, he received his first career start in a Week 12 loss, to the division-rival Baltimore Ravens, after replacing an injured Chris Kemoeatu at left guard. Foster returned to the starting position on December 20, 2009, against the Green Bay Packers and remained there for the last three games of the regular season, as the Steelers ended with a 9–7 record and missed the playoffs.

As a rookie in 2009, Foster had four starts and played in 14 games.

2010
Although he finished his rookie season as the starting left guard, he entered training camp competing with Trai Essex and Kraig Urbik for the starting job. He was named the backup to starting guards Essex and Kemoeatu to begin the season and made his season debut in a Week 3 38–13 victory at the Tampa Bay Buccaneers. On November 14, 2010, he made his first start of the season, replacing an ineffective Trai Essex at right guard, in a 39-26 loss to the New England Patriots. He then remained the starting guard for last 7 games of the 2010 season. The Steelers finished atop the AFC North with a 12–4 record and Foster went on to start at right guard in a 31–25 loss to the Green Bay Packers in Super Bowl XLV. He finished his second season with 8 starts in 12 games played.

2011
Foster entered training camp in 2011 competing with Chris Kemoeatu, Doug Legursky, and Trai Essex for both starting guard positions. He lost the starting right guard position to Legursky but was named the starter for a Week 2 victory over the Seattle Seahawks. After sitting out the next week, he returned in Week 4 against the Houston Texans and remained the starter for the rest of the season. This marked the third consecutive year he began the year as a backup but finished the season as a starter; also marking the beginning of Foster being a mainstay on the Pittsburgh Steeler's offensive line. He finished 2011 with a career-high 14 games started in 15 games played.

2012
Foster was named the starting right guard after winning the job over rookie David DeCastro and started the Pittsburgh Steeler's season-opener against Denver Broncos. This also marked his first full season playing and starting at guard.

2013
He was moved over to left guard after the departure of Willie Colon and started all but one game throughout the season. The Steelers kept Foster out due to injury during a Week 11 matchup against the Detroit Lions. On March 11, 2013, the Pittsburgh Steelers signed Foster to a three-year, $5.50 million contract that also included a $900,000 signing bonus. They rewarded him with a new contract after showing promise the last two seasons.

2014
He started the Pittsburgh Steeler's season-opening 30-27 victory over the Cleveland Browns and started the following game. Foster then missed Week 3 and 4, after twisting his ankle during a practice. He returned to his starting role during a Week 5 victory at the Jacksonville Jaguars. He started 14 games in 2014, helping the Pittsburgh Steelers finish first in the AFC North with an 11-5 record. They went on to lose the AFC Wildcard game 30-17 to the Baltimore Ravens.

2015
Foster started at left guard throughout the 2015 season and started all 16 regular season games. The Pittsburgh Steelers finished second in the AFC North with a 10-6 record. After defeating the Cincinnati Bengals in the AFC Wildcard, they went on to lose the divisional round to the eventual Super Bowl 50 Champion Denver Broncos. Foster had one of his best seasons after improving as a run blocker and surrendering only 31 pressures in all 18 games. He earned a grade of 82.3 from Pro Football Focus in 2015.

2016
On May 9, 2016, the Pittsburgh Steelers signed Foster to a three-year, $9.60 million contract with a signing bonus $2.75 million. He started all 16 regular season games and surrendered only one sack throughout the whole season. Foster brought his streak to 46 consecutive starts in-a-row. Pro Football Focus ranked him the 24th best offensive lineman in 2015. He was also ranked the sixth best guard with an overall grade of 87.1 by PFF and the fourth best in pass blocking with a grade of 89.7.

2019

On March 7, 2019, Foster signed a two-year, $8.25 million contract extension with the Steelers through the 2020 season.

Foster announced his retirement on March 16, 2020.

References

External links
UT Sports Official Bio
Pittsburgh Steelers Bio

1986 births
Living people
American football offensive tackles
Pittsburgh Steelers players
Tennessee Volunteers football players
Players of American football from Tennessee
People from Henning, Tennessee